A Little Moonlight is an album by Dianne Reeves released in 2003.

A Little Moonlight won Reeves her third consecutive Grammy Award for Best Jazz Vocal Album.

Track listing 
"Loads of Love" (Richard Rodgers) – 4:24
"I Concentrate on You" (Cole Porter) – 5:20
"Reflections" (Jon Hendricks, Blue Mink, Thelonious Monk) – 5:12
"Skylark" (Hoagy Carmichael, Johnny Mercer) – 6:52
"What a Little Moonlight Can Do" (Harry M. Woods) – 6:21
"Darn That Dream" (Eddie DeLange, Jimmy Van Heusen) – 4:46
"I'm All Smiles" (Herbert Martin, Michael Leonard) – 5:58
"Lullaby of Broadway" (Al Dubin, Harry Warren) – 5:35
"You Go to My Head" (J. Fred Coots, Haven Gillespie) – 7:25
"We'll Be Together Again" (Carl T. Fischer, Frankie Laine) – 4:35

Personnel 
 Dianne Reeves – vocals
 Romero Lubambo – guitar, arranger
 Reuben Rogers – bass
 Gregory Hutchinson – drums
 Peter Martin – piano, arranger
 Nicholas Payton – trumpet (track 9)
 Billy Childs Trio – arranger

Technical
 Arif Mardin – producer
 Ted Jensen – mastering
 Michael O'Reilly – engineer

Dianne Reeves albums
Blue Note Records albums
2003 albums
Albums produced by Arif Mardin
Grammy Award for Best Jazz Vocal Album